Nuits de la Fondation Maeght relates to the following albums recorded at Fondation Maeght and released on the French Shandar label
Nuits de la Fondation Maeght (Albert Ayler album), released as two volumes
Nuits de la Fondation Maeght (Sun Ra album), released as two volumes
The Great Concert of Cecil Taylor originally released as Nuits de la Fondation Maeght 3 LP box set

Shandar albums